"Right Beside You" is a song by British electronic producer Jakwob from his upcoming debut studio album. The song was released as a single on 8 May 2011 as a digital download in the United Kingdom. It features raps from Smiler, and the chorus's vocals provided by Nikki from Soundgirl.

Music video
A music video to accompany the release of "Right Beside You" was first released onto YouTube on 3 June 2011 at a total length of three minutes and twenty seconds.

Track listing

Chart performance

Release history

References

2011 singles
Jakwob songs
2011 songs
Mercury Records singles